"Dead by X-Mas" is a song by the Finnish rock band Hanoi Rocks. The single was released prior to the band's 1982 album Oriental Beat but neither the A- or B-side were featured on an album until the band's third album, Self Destruction Blues.

The songs are well liked and were the biggest hits of Hanoi Rocks' early career. The B-side, "Nothing New", is not as well known as the A-side, "Dead by X-Mas". "Dead by X-Mas" has since been thought to be as a prediction of the death of drummer Razzle, who died in a car crash in December 1984. The chorus even has the lyrics "I'll be dead by X-mas now anyway". The lyrics tell a horror story which guitarist Andy McCoy said could happen.

A cover version was released by the Japanese Visual kei band The Piass as a bonus track on their first album, Ryouki Kousatsu Chissoku-Shi, in 1995. The song also played a role in an urban legend similar to that of Razzle's, since the vocalist and drummer, Chihiro and Hiroshi, died while filming a music video later that year. English electronic music band Sohodolls also released a cover version of the song in 2007.

Track listing

Personnel 
Michael Monroe – lead vocals, piano, guitar
Andy McCoy – lead guitar, vocals on "Nothing New"
Nasty Suicide – rhythm guitar
Sam Yaffa – bass
Gyp Casino – drums

Hanoi Rocks songs
1981 songs
Number-one singles in Finland
Songs written by Andy McCoy